Turbinellidae are a family of sea snails, marine gastropod mollusks in the clade Neogastropoda. Members of this family are predators.

Distribution
Species in this family are found worldwide, mostly in tropical shallow waters but some in deep waters.

Subfamilies 
 sub-family Columbariinae Tomlin, 1928
 genus Columbarium Martens, 1881
 genus Coluzea Finlay, 1926
 genus Fulgurofusus Grabau, 1904
 genus Fustifusus Harasewych, 1991
 genus Peristarium Bayer, 1971
 sub-family Tudiclinae Cossmann, 1901
 genus Tudicla Röding, 1798
 sub-family Turbinellinae Swainson, 1835
 genus Cryptofusus Beu, 2011
 genus Syrinx Röding, 1798
 genus Turbinella Lamarck, 1799
 sub-family Vasinae H. Adams & A. Adams, 1853 (1840)
 genus Altivasum Hedley, 1914
 genus Enigmavasum Poppe & Tagaro, 2005
 genus Pisanella Koenen, 1865
 genus Tudivasum Rosenberg & Petit, 1987
 genus Vasum Röding, 1798
 genus Pisanella Koenen, 1865 †

Genera brought into synonymy 
 Buccinella Perry, 1811 : synonym of  Turbinella Lamarck, 1799
 Cynodonta Schumacher, 1817 : synonym of Vasum Röding, 1798
 Surculina Dall, 1908: synonym of Exilia Conrad, 1860
 Tudicula H. Adams & A. Adams, 1864 : synonym of Tudivasum Rosenberg & Petit, 1987

References

 Costello, M.J.; Emblow, C.; White, R. (Ed.). (2001). European register of marine species: a check-list of the marine species in Europe and a bibliography of guides to their identification. Collection Patrimoines Naturels, 50. Muséum national d'Histoire Naturelle: Paris, France. . 463 pp.

External links